The men's 1500 metres event at the 2002 World Junior Championships in Athletics was held in Kingston, Jamaica, at National Stadium on 19 and 21 July.

Medalists

Results

Final
21 July

Heats
19 July

Heat 1

Heat 2

Participation
According to an unofficial count, 32 athletes from 26 countries participated in the event.

References

1500 metres
1500 metres at the World Athletics U20 Championships